Susan Fales-Hill (born August 15, 1962) is an American television producer, author, screenwriter and an advocate for the arts and education.

Biography
Fales-Hill is the daughter of Haitian-American actress Josephine Premice, who was well known for her work on the Broadway stage, and Timothy Fales, an American stockbroker, whose ancestors were pilgrims arriving on the Mayflower from England in 1620. She attended the Lycée Français de New York and graduated from Harvard University with a degree in literature and history.

Fales-Hill was a writer for The Cosby Show and the lead writer and producer for A Different World.

Fales-Hill married Aaron Hill, a New York banker, in 1997. Their daughter Bristol was born in 2003.

In addition to her native English, Fales-Hill is able to speak French, Italian,  Spanish, and speaks some Haitian Creole.

References

External links

Living people
1962 births
American people of English descent
American people of Haitian descent
Lycée Français de New York alumni
Harvard College alumni
American television executives
Women television executives
Television producers from New York City
American expatriates in Italy
Screenwriters from New York (state)